Charles-Antoine Leclerc de La Bruère (1716 in Crépy-en-Valois – 18 September 1754 in Rome) was an 18th-century French historian and diplomat.

He is mostly known as the librettist of the tragédie lyrique Dardanus by Jean-Philippe Rameau. The booklet was generally considered one of the worst that has been set to music by the composer. La Bruère amalgamated second rank  mythological elements and epic reminiscences of the Italian Renaissance in an action of consummate improbability: the plot had to be amended several times to counter criticism.

From November 1744 to June 1748, La Bruère along Louis Fuzelier (another librettist working for Rameau), was director of the Mercure de France by royal patent.

In 1749, he went to Rome  as secretary of embassy to the Duke of Nivernais.

Works 
1734: Les Mécontents, one-act comedy, Comédie-Française, 1 December 
1736: Les Voyages de l'Amour, four-act ballet, Académie royale de musique, 3 May
1739: Dardanus, tragédie lyrique in 5 acts and one prologue, music by Jean-Philippe Rameau, Académie royale de musique, 19 November 
1744: La Convalescence du Roi, poem
1745: Histoire du règne de Charlemagne, 2 vol.
1748: Érigone, ballet en 1 acte, musique de Mondonville, Château de Versailles, Théâtre des petits appartements, 21 March
1749: Le Prince de Noisy, three-act ballet héroïque, music by François Rebel and François Francœur, Versailles, Théâtre des petits appartements, 13 March
1746: La Coquette fixéee, comedy in 3 acts and in verse, with the Duke of Nivernais and Claude-Henri de Fusée de Voisenon, Comédiens italiens ordinaires du roi, 10 March
1758: Les Fêtes de Paphos, ballet héroïque, Académie royale de musique, 9 May
1769: Linus, five-act tragédie lyrique, music by Pierre Montan Berton, Antoine Dauvergne and Jean-Claude Trial

Bibliography 
 Cardinal Georges Grente (dir.), Dictionnaire des lettres françaises.

References

External links 
  Charles-Antoine Leclerc de La Bruère on data.bnf.fr
 List of his plays on CÉSAR

18th-century French diplomats
18th-century French historians
18th-century French dramatists and playwrights
French opera librettists
1714 births
1754 deaths